Wallace Chapel AME Zion Church is located at 138-142 Broad Street at the intersection of Broad and Orchard streets in Summit, Union County, New Jersey, United States. It was organized in 1923 and the church building was completed in 1937, the second black church in that city. It was listed on the New Jersey and National Registers of Historic Places in 2007. In 2008, the General Conference of The AME Zion Church designated Wallace Chapel AME Zion Church a Historical Landmark of the AME Zion Church.

The congregation was first established in 1923, and met at the local YMCA. Two years later, The Rev. Florence Spearing Randolph, a former suffragette and activist, was appointed temporary pastor. In 1928 the church acquired its first building, a small house on the church's current site with enough space on the first floor to seat a hundred people at services. This duplex house is now the parsonage and community house. Rev. Dr. Florence S. Randolph served as pastor of the church from 1925 until her retirement in 1946. Rev. Dr. Denison D. Harrield, Jr. was appointed as pastor of the church on October 1, 1989.

Gallery

See also
National Register of Historic Places listings in Union County, New Jersey

References

African-American history of New Jersey
African Methodist Episcopal Zion churches
Churches completed in 1937
Churches in Union County, New Jersey
National Register of Historic Places in Union County, New Jersey
Churches on the National Register of Historic Places in New Jersey
Summit, New Jersey